Paul Coggins is a Gaelic football manager. He managed London from 2011 until 2015. As of 2019, Coggins managed Tír Chonaill Gaels.

Coggins almost led London to victory over Mayo in 2011, during his first season in charge. He led London to their first Connacht Senior Football Championship victory in 36 years over Sligo in 2013, then onwards to a first appearance in the Connacht final. Resigning in 2015, he resumed managing with the Tír Chonaill Gaels junior team before taking his first senior club management role since 2009 in 2018.

Married to Ann, Coggins is originally from County Roscommon. He has written the column "Cog's Corner" for The Irish Post.

References

Year of birth missing (living people)
Living people
Gaelic football managers
Gaelic games writers and broadcasters
Irish columnists